Douglas de Oliveira, simply Douglas (born 30 January 1986 in Ponta Grossa, Paraná), is a Brazilian footballer who plays as attacker and that currently playing on Criciúma

Football career
Douglas started his career with América Mineiro, also serving a brief loan at Grêmio. In the 2008 summer he was sold to Vitória de Guimarães, spending his first season severely injured, but still scoring four goals in the league, namely in a 3–1 win at C.D. Trofense on 28 September 2008.

Douglas was sparingly used by Guimarães in the following two seasons combined, only finding the net once. On 1 June 2011 the free agent signed a four-year contract with Minho neighbours S.C. Braga, being loaned to fellow top-divisioner S.C. Beira-Mar the following month, in a season-long move.

References

External links

Guardian stats centre

1986 births
Living people
People from Ponta Grossa
Brazilian footballers
Association football forwards
Campeonato Brasileiro Série A players
América Futebol Clube (MG) players
Grêmio Foot-Ball Porto Alegrense players
Criciúma Esporte Clube players
Primeira Liga players
Vitória S.C. players
S.C. Braga players
S.C. Beira-Mar players
Brazilian expatriate footballers
Expatriate footballers in Portugal
Sportspeople from Paraná (state)